The Fruitas Shakers are the team in the PBA D-League for two conferences in 2012 PBA D-League Aspirant's Cup and 2013 PBA D-League Foundation Cup. They are affiliated with Talk 'N Text Tropang Texters in PBA. Their coach is Nash Racela and most of their players are coming from San Beda College.

Roster

2012–13 Aspirants Cup

Controversy
On October 25, 2012, the Shakers debut with an 88-82 win over Cafe France at the Ynares Sports Arena in Pasig. Their win was forfeited by the league when they field in an ineligible player Joseph Eriobu in the second quarter of that game. Eriobu lack the documentary requirements to prove that he is a Filipino citizen. PBA Commissioner Chito Salud also slapped the team with a ₱25,000 fine.

References

External links
Fruitas Group
@fruitasshakes on Twitter

PBA Developmental League teams